Ramipril, sold under the brand name Altace among others, is an ACE inhibitor type medication used to treat high blood pressure, heart failure, and diabetic kidney disease. It can also be used as a preventative medication in patients over 55 years old to reduce the risk of having a heart attack, stroke or cardiovascular death in patients shown to be at high risk, such as some diabetics and patients with vascular disease. It is a reasonable initial treatment for high blood pressure. It is taken by mouth.

Common side effects include headaches, dizziness, feeling tired, and cough. Serious side effects may include liver problems, angioedema, kidney problems, and high blood potassium. Use in pregnancy and breastfeeding is not recommended. It is an ACE inhibitor and works by decreasing renin-angiotensin-aldosterone system activity.

Ramipril was patented in 1981 and approved for medical use in 1989. It is available as a generic medication. In 2020, it was the 196th most commonly prescribed medication in the United States, with more than 2million prescriptions.

Structure and Activity Relationship 
Ramipril is a pro-drug. The molecule must be hydrolyzed by the esterase at the OCH2CH3 and form a carboxylate. This carboxylate then interacts with the positive Zn+2 to inhibit the ACE enzyme. The COOH helps orient it with the enzyme. Ramipril is similar in structure to the Trandolapril ACE Inhibitor but it has a cyclopentane instead of cyclohexane.

Medical uses
Medical uses include:
High blood pressure 
Congestive heart failure
Following heart attack in people with evidence of heart failure
People over 55 years at high risk: prevention of heart attack, stroke, cardiovascular death, or need of revascularization procedures
To prevent the onset and progression of kidney damage due to diabetes with or without protein in the urine. Randomized trial evidence suggests that a maximum tolerable dose prevents cardiovascular events and death in patients with diabetic kidney disease.

Contraindications
Contraindications to its use include volume-depleted patients, a history of angioedema while on an ACE inhibitor, pregnancy and hypotension.

People should not take ramipril (or any ACE inhibitors) if they have hyperkalemia. It is also recommended to avoid using salt-substitutes as this can further increase potassium levels in the blood.

Ramipril can be considered safe and well-tolerated for most people with renovascular disease (narrowing of the artery to one or both kidneys) only if close blood test monitoring is available at the start of therapy. Treatment with Ramipril in some patients with significant narrowing in both kidneys can increase serum creatinine concentration (measured in the blood test), which returns to baseline upon therapy cessation.

Adverse effects
Shakiness
Dry cough
Dizziness and light-headedness due to low blood pressure
Fatigue, especially in the early stages
Mouth dryness in the early stages
Nausea
Fainting
Signs of infection (e.g., fever, chills, persistent sore throat)
Chest pain
Neutropenia (low white blood cells)
Impotence (erectile dysfunction)
Hyperkalemia

Serious allergic reactions to this drug are unlikely, but immediate medical attention must be sought if they occur. Symptoms of a serious allergic reaction include, but are not limited to a rash or swelling of the face, mouth, tongue, or throat. In extreme cases, ramipril may lead to potentially fatal liver problems.

Mechanism of action

ACE inhibitors inhibit the actions of angiotensin converting enzyme (ACE), thereby lowering the production of angiotensin II and decreasing the breakdown of bradykinin. The decrease in angiotensin II results in relaxation of arteriole smooth muscle leading to a decrease in total peripheral resistance, reducing blood pressure as the blood is pumped through widened vessels. Its effect on bradykinin is responsible for the dry cough side effect.

Ramipril, a prodrug or precursor drug, is converted to the active metabolite ramiprilat by carboxylesterase 1. Ramiprilat is mostly excreted by the kidneys. Its half-life is variable (3–16 hours), and is prolonged by heart and liver failure, as well as kidney failure.

Society and culture

US patent
The compound was protected by a patent which was assigned to the German pharmaceutical company Hoechst AG (since merged into Aventis) on 29 October 1991. The patent was scheduled to expire on 29 October 2008. On 11 September 2007, in an appeal by the Indian company Lupin Ltd., the United States Court of Appeals for the Federal Circuit reversed a district court trial verdict and found that Aventis's patent on ramipril was invalid for "obviousness", opening this drug to generic manufacturers.

Brand names
Ramipril is marketed as Prilace by Arrow Pharmaceuticals in Australia, Ramipro by Westfield Pharma in the Philippines, Triatec by Sanofi-Aventis in Italy and United States and Altace by King Pharmaceuticals in the United States, Novapril by Pharmanova in Ghana, Ramitens by PharmaSwiss, Ampril by Krka in Slovenia, Corpril by Cemelog-BRS in Hungary, Piramil and Prilinda by Hemofarm in Serbia, by Lek in Poland and by Novartis and Opsonin Pharma Limited as Ramace in Bangladesh, and in Canada as Altace (Sonfi) and Ramipril (Pharmascience).

Ramipril is marketed in India under the brand names Cardace, Zigpril, Ramistar, Odipril and Zorem . Ramipril is marketed in Myanmar under brand name Endpril .

Research
The Heart Outcomes and Prevention Evaluation trial seemed to show ramipril possessed cardioprotective qualities which extended beyond its qualities as an antihypertensive. However, the trial and the interpretation of its results have been criticised.

The Acute Infarction Ramipril Efficacy (AIRE) trial showed a 27% reduction in mortality for patients receiving ramipril for chronic heart failure following a myocardial infarction.

Ramipril was found to have similar results as telmisartan, an angiotensin II receptor blocker.

References

External links 
 

ACE inhibitors
Carboxamides
Carboxylic acids
Enantiopure drugs
Ethyl esters
Prodrugs
Sanofi
Pfizer brands
AstraZeneca brands
Wikipedia medicine articles ready to translate